Ilya Nikolayevich Petukhov (born 8 January 2001) is a Russian football player. He plays for FC Rodina Moscow.

Club career
He made his debut in the Russian Football National League for FC Olimp-Dolgoprudny on 6 March 2022 in a game against FC Spartak-2 Moscow.

References

External links
 
 
 
 Profile by Russian Football National League

2001 births
Sportspeople from Nizhny Novgorod
Living people
Russian footballers
Russia youth international footballers
Association football midfielders
FC Lokomotiv Moscow players
FC Olimp-Dolgoprudny players
Russian Second League players
Russian First League players